The 2012–13 Western Sydney Wanderers FC W-League season was the club's inaugural season. The club participated in the W-League for the first time, placing sixth in the competition.

Season overview

Players

Squad information

Transfers in

Technical staff

Squad statistics

Appearances and goals

Goal scorers

Competitions

W-League

League table

Results summary

Matches

References

External links
 Official Website

Western Sydney Wanderers FC (A-League Women) seasons
West